Agafiya is a Russian Christian female first name. Its colloquial forms are Agafya (which can also be the main form of a related name) and Ogafya. Like its traditional English form Agatha, it is derived from the Greek word meaning good, kind, noble. 

Agafa can also be a variant of the name Agafiya.

People with the first name
Agafya (Agafiya) Grushetskaya (1663–1681), Tsaritsa of Russia, wife of Feodor III
Agafia Lykova (1944- ), a Russian Old Believer, part of the Lykov family, who has lived alone in the taiga for most of her life.

References

Notes

Sources
А. В. Суперанская (A. V. Superanskaya). "Словарь русских имён" (Dictionary of Russian Names). Издательство Эксмо. Москва, 2005. 


Given names of Greek language origin